Manasiloru Manimuthu is a 1986 Indian Malayalam-language drama film directed by J. Sasikumar and written by S. L. Puram Sadanandan from a story by Sasikumar, produced by Royal Achankunju. The film stars Mohanlal, Suresh Gopi, Urvashi and Sankaradi. The film's songs were composed by Shyam, while the background score was provided by Johnson.

Plot

Cast
Mohanlal 
Suresh Gopi 
Urvashi 
Sankaradi 
Jagathy Sreekumar 
Vijayaraghavan 
K. P. Ummer 
Thikkurissy Sukumaran Nair 
Meena 
Kaviyoor Ponnamma 
Babitha
Baby Adheena
Devi
Raji
Mythili

Soundtrack

Release

References

External links
 

1986 films
1980s Malayalam-language films
Indian drama films